Kvartetten som sprängdes is a 1924 novel by Swedish author Birger Sjöberg.

A film adaption was made by Arne Bornebusch in 1936, another in 1950 by Gustaf Molander and one by Hans Alfredson in 1973. It was also made into a graphic novel by Malin Biller in 2015.

References

1924 Swedish novels
Swedish-language novels